Yuxarı Salamabad (also, Salamabad and Yukhary Salamabad) is a village in the Yevlakh Rayon of Azerbaijan. The village forms part of the municipality of Xaldan.

References 

Populated places in Yevlakh District